Arno Wehling was born in 1947 in the city of Rio de Janeiro, son of Eugen Horst Theodor Wehling and Helena Wehling, born in Düsseldorf and Florianópolis, respectively. He is married to professor and historian Maria José Cavalleiro de Macedo Wehling, born in Belém do Pará, with whom he has published works and conducted research.

He graduated in history from the National Faculty of Philosophy of the University of Brazil and in law from the University Santa Úrsula, obtained a doctorate in history from the University of São Paulo (USP), where he also did postdoctoral work.

All his professional work was focused on academia, where he practiced teaching, research and management. He became full professor of theory and methodology of history at the Federal University of Rio de Janeiro (UFRJ) and of history of law and institutions at the Federal University of the State of Rio de Janeiro (UNIRIO).

As a teacher and researcher, he worked on the implementation and development of the graduate programs in history at UFRJ and UNIRIO and the undergraduate courses in archivology, pedagogy, law and history. He was also a professor in the graduate programs in law and philosophy at UFRJ and in law at University Gama Filho and University Veiga de Almeida. He was visiting professor at the University of Lisbon and University of Portucalense. In university management he was head of department and dean of the Humanities Center of UNIRIO and dean at UGF.

His work as a historian and essayist developed in the fields of the epistemology of the humanities / history, the history of political and legal ideas and the history of law / institutions. He has studied the relations between the philosophy of science and historical knowledge, historicism, the problem of historical objectivity, Renaissance humanism and epistemological aspects related to history in the works of Ranke, Tocqueville, Kant, Goethe, Nietzsche and Ortega y Gasset and, among Brazilians, those of Varnhagen, Capistrano de Abreu and Sílvio Romero.

Within the scope of scientific and cultural entities, he has been a member since 1976 of the Brazilian Historical and Geographic Institute, where he served as president; Ibero-American history academies (Argentina, Uruguay, Paraguay, Colombia, Venezuela, Portugal and Spain); the Lisbon Academy of Sciences, state historical institutes; the Academies Carioca and Catarinense de Letras and the Brazilian Academy of Education.

He is a member of the editorial boards of specialized journals in Brazil and abroad; the Technical Council of the National Trade Confederation and the Advisory Council of the National Historical and Artistic Heritage Institute (IPHAN).

He is the author of numerous books, book chapters, entries in reference works, conferences and communications in the annals of scientific events, critical edition of texts, and articles in specialized journals.

On March 9, 2017, he was elected to the Brazilian Academy of Letters to occupy chair 37, in the vacancy of Ferreira Gullar. He is the eighth occupant of the seat; he was received on August 11, 2017 by academician Alberto da Costa e Silva.

References

Brazilian writers
Living people
1947 births
Members of the Lisbon Academy of Sciences
Academic staff of the Federal University of Rio de Janeiro